The 2014 Spanish Athletics Championships was the 94th edition of the national championship in outdoor track and field for Spain. It was held on 26 and 27 July at the Polideportivo José Caballero in Alcobendas. It served as the selection meeting for Spain at the 2014 European Athletics Championships.

The club championships in relays and combined track and field events were contested separately from the main competition.

Results

Men

Women

References

Results
XCIV Campeonato de España Absoluto . Royal Spanish Athletics Federation. Retrieved 2019-06-30.

External links 
 Official website of the Royal Spanish Athletics Federation 

2014
Spanish Athletics Championships
Spanish Championships
Athletics Championships
Sport in the Community of Madrid